The 2021 NBL season was the 40th season of the National Basketball League.

As a result of the modified, COVID-affected 2020 season, three of the top four teams in 2019 (Wellington Saints, Hawke's Bay Hawks and Southland Sharks) did not compete. All three teams re-entered in 2021 to increase the league's total number to 10 for the first time since 2014.

The regular season commenced on 24 April in Dunedin with the Otago Nuggets (2020 champions) hosting the Wellington Saints (2019 champions) at the Edgar Centre. The season contained 12 weeks of regular season games followed by a two-day finals schedule in July. The Saints won their 12th NBL championship in 2021 with a win over the Hawks in the grand final.

Team information

Summary
In the final round of the regular season, due to an extreme weather event and major flooding across the top of the South Island, the games between the Manawatu Jets and Nelson Giants (Sunday 5pm) and Taranaki Mountainairs and Nelson Giants (Monday 7:30pm) were both cancelled. With the games not having an impact on the 2021 Final Four, the League advised neither clash would be rescheduled.

Regular season standings

Final Four

Awards

Statistics leaders
Stats as of the end of the regular season

Regular season
 Most Valuable Player: Dion Prewster (Wellington Saints)
 Most Outstanding Guard: Dion Prewster (Wellington Saints)
 Most Outstanding NZ Guard: Dion Prewster (Wellington Saints)
 Most Outstanding Forward: Sam Timmins (Otago Nuggets)
 Most Outstanding NZ Forward/Centre: Sam Timmins (Otago Nuggets)
 Scoring Champion: Hunter Hale (Nelson Giants)
 Rebounding Champion: Sam Timmins (Otago Nuggets)
 Assist Champion: Courtney Belger (Southland Sharks)
 Most Improved Player: Sam Timmins (Otago Nuggets)
 Defensive Player of the Year: Dion Prewster (Wellington Saints)
 Youth Player of the Year: Zach Riley (Auckland Huskies)
 Coach of the Year: Zico Coronel (Wellington Saints)
 All-Star Five:
 G: Dion Prewster (Wellington Saints)
 G: Hunter Hale (Nelson Giants)
 F: Dom Kelman-Poto (Southland Sharks)
 F: Taane Samuel (Wellington Saints)
 C: Sam Timmins (Otago Nuggets)

Final Four
 Grand Final MVP: Kerwin Roach (Wellington Saints)

References

External links
Final Four schedule
Grand Final preview
Grand Final report
"New Zealand NBL has bold plans for its 40th season in 2021" at stuff.co.nz
"Your complete guide to the 2021 New Zealand NBL season" at stuff.co.nz

National Basketball League (New Zealand) seasons
NBL